USS Wyandank was a steamer acquired by the Union Navy during the American Civil War. She was used by the Union Navy as a storeship and as a barracks ship in support of the Union Navy blockade of Confederate waterways.

Service history

Wyandank—a wooden-hulled, sidewheel ferryboat built at New York City in 1847 and sometimes documented as Wyandanck—was acquired by the Union Navy on 12 September 1861 from the Union Ferry Co. of Brooklyn, New York. Wyandank was used during the Civil War as storeship for the Potomac Flotilla. After hostilities ended, Wyandank served at Annapolis, Maryland, into the 1870s as a floating barracks for United States Marines assigned to the United States Naval Academy. She was broken up there in 1879.

See also

Union Blockade

References

Ships of the Union Navy
Ships built in New York City
Steamships of the United States Navy
Stores ships of the United States Navy
1847 ships